Wormingford is a village and civil parish in Essex, England.

The Stour forms the northern boundary, and the eastern, southern, and western ones follow mainly field boundaries, but sometimes cut through fields. Detached fields totalling  in Little Horkesley, were transferred to that parish in 1889.

Wormingford has a post office and a public house and restaurant called The Crown.

Most of the parish lies on a relatively high plain which drains northwards to the River Stour and southwards to the River Colne. From the Stour the ground rises southwards to reach a height of more than 225 ft (70 m) in the south-west. A band of alluvium runs beside the Stour and there are river terrace deposits south of that, then, as the ground rises, bands of London clay, and sands and gravels. Most of the higher south part of the parish is boulder clay, good farming land, with a small pocket of sands and gravels running south-east from Wood Hall. 

The main road from Colchester to Bures and Sudbury (B1508) runs from south-east to north-west across the parish. Minor roads connected the parish with Assington (Suffolk) across Wormingford bridge, with Fordham, and with Little Horkesley and Nayland (Suffolk). Other minor roads and tracks and a network of footpaths link the scattered farms and houses.

The ford from which the parish takes its name (originally 'Withermund's ford') was probably that in the river Stour by the watermill, at the bottom of Church Road, where there is a sand bank in the middle of the river. A ford further east near Garnons has also been suggested, but seems less likely. The Church Road ford was replaced before 1802 by a bridge, called a horse-bridge in 1812. About 1821 Messrs. Jones, who leased the river tolls, built a new bridge, apparently a narrow wooden footbridge. It collapsed in the winter of 1895–6 and was replaced by an iron bridge in 1898.

The modern form of the place name, recorded from 1254, gave rise to three stories of dragons, ('worm' meaning serpent or dragon). The first story says the village is the location where the patron saint of England, St George, killed his dragon; a mound in the village is said to cover the body of the legendary dragon. The second, also unsubstantiated, is that a crocodile escaped from Richard I of England's menagerie in the Tower of London and caused much damage in Wormingford before being killed by Sir George Marney; a stained-glass window in St Andrew's Church depicts this legend. The third, written in 1405 by John de Trokelowe, a monk, told of a dragon who threatened Richard Waldegrave's territory near Sudbury but fled into the Mere when pursued.

A large number of scattered archaeological finds from all periods from the Neolithic suggest that settlement was first on the flood plain, alongside the Stour, before woodland on the higher ground further south was gradually cleared. Prehistoric tools were found in the complex of ring ditches and other crop marks near the mere in the north-west of the parish (see below); when a Bronze Age barrow nearby was destroyed in 1836 'hundreds of urns in rows' were found.

The artist John Constable of East Bergholt (1776–1837), had Wormingford associations, his relatives farming at Wormingford Hall and Gernons. John Nash who lived at the Elizabethan yeoman's house, Bottengoms, painted in and around the village from 1929 until 1977. The author Ronald Blythe inherited Bottengoms from Nash, who had bought the house in 1944. 
Blythe wrote a column, "Word from Wormingford", in the Church Times from 1993 to 2017.

Wormingford Mere
It is a 12,000-year-old natural feature known as a kettle hole. Colchester Archaeological Group  says that the mere's "relationship to its surrounding features [including crop marks, see above] is striking" and that it might "have played some role in ceremonial activity", perhaps being seen as "an entrance to the spirit underworld".

Wormingford Air Field

Originally a relief airfield for biplanes in the First World War, the airfield was expanded by Richard Costain Ltd and a number of sub-contractors during the period 1942/43. Earmarked for an Eighth Heavy Bomb Group, nothing ever came of this and at the end of November 1943 the yet to be completed station was handed to the Ninth Air Force for use by one of its Fighter Groups. On 30 November, the 362nd Fighter Group arrived at Wormingford.

The Group was assigned to the 70th Fighter Wing. It did not fly its first mission until 8 February 1944. Its operational status at Wormingford was a short one and they left on 8 April 1944. During its stay, the 362nd mounted over 30 missions, losing five aircraft.

The next group to move in was the 55th Fighter Group with its P-38 Lightnings from Nuthampstead in Hertfordshire. The 55th's role as a fighter group was to be a short one due to some of the disadvantages of the aircraft. However, the 55th later become renowned for ground strafing and ground attack bombing. On D-Day, the P-38 groups were given the task of acting as convoy escorts for the armada of ships moving to and from Normandy.
The 55th was selected to serve with the occupation forces in Germany and in July 1945 it left Wormingford for Gielbelstadt airfield in Bavaria. The old airfield is now used by the Essex and Suffolk Gliding Club.

Wormingford Cricket Club 
The cricket club has been a part of the village for many years. The team currently plays in the PDQ North division, which it joined in 1976 then rejoined in 1991.

References

Excerpts from:
'Wormingford: Introduction', A History of the County of Essex: Volume 10: *Lexden Hundred (Part) including Dedham, Earls Colne and Wivenhoe (2001), pp. 295–99.
. Date accessed: 6 September 2006.

External links
The Manors of Wormingford Hall and Church Hall
Wormingford Workhouse

Villages in Essex
Civil parishes in Essex
Borough of Colchester